Roland De Wolfe is an English professional poker player and a former writer for the poker magazine Inside Edge.

After winning first prize in an event at the 2004 Gutshot Poker Festival, De Wolfe went on to cash in the $1,000 No Limit event of the 2005 World Series of Poker (WSOP).

In July 2005, De Wolfe won first place in the Major Grand Prix de Paris event of the World Poker Tour (WPT)'s fourth season, defeating former champion Juha Helppi in the final heads-up battle.

In April 2006, De Wolfe finished 3rd out of 605 entries in the WPT $25,000 Championship event at the Bellagio, winning over $1,000,000.  In October 2006, De Wolfe won the European Poker Tour (EPT) Dublin event, and the €554,300 first prize. In the process, he became the first person to win an event in the WPT and the EPT. This achievement was superseded in January 2008 when Gavin Griffin won a WPT event to follow up on his WSOP and EPT wins, thus becoming the first person to win titles in all three competitions.

De Wolfe also reached the final table of the 2008 edition of Late Night Poker, finishing in 2nd place to Andreas Jorbeck.

In June 2009, De Wolfe won his first World Series of Poker bracelet, winning the $5,000 Pot Limit Omaha Hi-Low Split 8 or Better tournament for $246,616 and in doing so became only the second person (after Gavin Griffin) to complete the hat-trick of WSOP, EPT, and WPT titles.

As of 2014, his total live tournament winnings exceed $5,325,000. His 17 cashes at the WSOP account for $1,214,153 of those winnings.

References

External links
 Blonde Poker interview
 PokerListings.com player profile

1979 births
Poker players from London
European Poker Tour winners
Living people
World Poker Tour winners
World Series of Poker bracelet winners